Jester Naefe (1924–1967) was an Austrian stage and film actress. She became a leading star of German cinema in the 1950s, but was forced to retire at the height of her fame due to illness.

Filmography

References

Bibliography
 Fritsche, Maria. Homemade Men in Postwar Austrian Cinema: Nationhood, Genre and Masculinity. Berghahn Books, 2013.

External links

1924 births
1967 deaths
Austrian film actresses
Austrian emigrants to Germany
Actresses from Vienna